Periannan Senapathy is a molecular biologist, geneticist, author and entrepreneur. He is the founder, president and chief scientific officer at Genome International Corporation, a biotechnology, bioinformatics, and information technology firm based in Madison, Wisconsin, which develops computational genomics applications of next-generation DNA sequencing (NGS)  and clinical decision support systems for analyzing patient genome data that aids in diagnosis and treatment of diseases.

Dr. Senapathy is known for his contributions in genetics, genomics and clinical genomics, especially in the biology of RNA splicing and the split structure of eukaryotic genes. He developed the Shapiro & Senapathy algorithm (S&S) for predicting the splice sites, exons and genes of eukaryotes, which has become the primary methodology for discovering disease-causing mutations in splice junctions. The S&S has been implemented in many gene-finding and mutation detection tools  that are used extensively in major clinical and research institutions around the world for uncovering mutations in thousands of patients with numerous diseases, including cancers and inherited disorders. It is increasingly used in the Next Generation Sequencing era, as it is widely realized that >50% of all diseases and adverse drug reactions in humans and other animals possibly occur within the splicing regions of genes. The S&S algorithm has been cited in ~4,000 publications on finding splicing mutations in thousands of cancer and inherited disorders.

Dr. Senapathy offered a new hypothesis on the origin of introns, split genes and splice junctions in eukaryotic genes. As the split structure of genes is central to eukaryotic biology, their origin has been a major question in biology. Dr. Senapathy proposed the "split gene theory," which states that the split structure arose due to the origin of split genes from random DNA sequences, and provided tangible evidence from genome sequences of several organisms.  He also showed that the splice junctions of eukaryotic genes could have originated from the stop codon ends of the Open Reading Frames (ORFs) in random DNA sequences based on analysis of eukaryotic genomic DNA sequences. Dr. Marshall Nirenberg, the Nobel Laureate who had deciphered codons, communicated the papers to the PNAS. Senapathy has published his other scientific findings in journals including Science, Nucleic Acids Research, PNAS, Journal of Biological Chemistry, and Journal of Molecular Biology, and is the author of several patents in the genomics field.

Biography 
Senapathy has a Ph.D. in molecular biology from the Indian Institute of Science, Bangalore, India. He spent twelve years in genome research for the National Institutes of Health's Laboratory of Molecular and Cell Biology (NIADDK) and the Laboratory of Statistical and Mathematical Methodology in the Division of Computer Research and Technology (DCRT) in Bethesda, Maryland (1980–87), and the Biotechnology Center and the Department of Genetics of the University of Wisconsin, Madison (1987–91). Dr. Senapathy founded Genome International in 1992 for developing computational biology research, products and services

Notable research contributions 
Dr. Senapathy has provided major contributions in RNA splicing biology, impacting the understanding of the structure, function, and origin of the eukaryotic exons, introns, splice junctions, and split genes, and the applications of these findings in human medicine that has positively affected thousands of patients with hundreds of diseases including cancers and inherited disorders. His research is an example of the application of basic molecular biology research findings to human medicine with profound impact, and a variety of basic science and other practical applications in animals and plants.

Origin of split genes from random DNA sequences 
The split gene theory answers major questions of why and how the split genes of eukaryotes originated. It states that if coding sequences for biological proteins originated from random primordial genetic sequences, the random occurrence of the 3 stop codons out of 64 codons would limit the open reading frames (ORFs) to a very short length of ~60 bases. Thus, coding sequences for biological proteins with average lengths of ~1,200 bases, and long coding sequences of 6,000 bases, can practically never occur in random sequences. Thus, genes had to occur in pieces in a split form, with short coding sequences (ORFs) that became exons, interrupted by very long random sequences that became introns. When the eukaryotic DNA was tested for ORF length distribution, it exactly matched that from random DNA, with very short ORFs that matched the lengths of exons, and very long introns as predicted, supporting the split gene theory.  Thus, introns are relics left over from their random sequence origin, and thus are earmarked to be removed at the primary RNA stage, although incidentally they may have few genetic elements useful to the cell. The Nobel Laureate Dr. Marshall Nirenberg, who deciphered the codons, communicated the paper to the PNAS. New Scientist covered this publication titled "A long explanation for introns".

Noted molecular biologist and biophysicist Dr. Colin Blake from the Laboratory of Molecular Biophysics and Oxford Centre for Molecular Sciences, University of Oxford, commented on Dr. Senapathy's theory that: "Recent work by Dr. Senapathy, when applied to RNA, comprehensively explains the origin of the segregated form of RNA into coding and non-coding regions. It also suggests why a splicing mechanism was developed at the start of primordial evolution. The presence of random sequence was therefore sufficient to create in the primordial ancestor the segregated form of RNA observed in the eukaryotic gene structure."

Origin of RNA splice junction signals from stop codons of ORFs 
Dr. Senapathy's research also elucidates the origin of the splice junctions of eukaryotic genes, again the major questions of why and how the splice junction signals originated. Dr. Senapathy predicted that, if the split gene theory was true, the ends of these ORFs that had a stop codon would have become the ends of exons that would occur within introns, and that would define the splice junctions. Senapathy found that almost all splice junctions in eukaryotic genes contained stop codons exactly at the ends of introns, bordering the exons as predicted. In fact, these stop codons were found to form the "canonical" AG:GT splicing sequence, with the three stop codons occurring as part of the strong consensus signals. Senapathy had observed that mutations in these stop codon bases within splice junctions were the cause of the majority of diseases caused by splicing mutations, emphasizing the importance of stop codons in the splice junctions. Thus, the basic split gene theory led to the hypothesis that the splice junctions originated from the stop codons.  Dr. Marshall Nirenberg supported the publication of this paper in the PNAS. New Scientist covered this publication titled "Exons, Introns and Evolution".

Why exons are short and introns are long 
Research based on the split gene theory sheds lights on other basic questions of exons and introns. The exons of eukaryotes are generally short (human exons average ~120 bases, and can be as short as 10 bases) and introns are usually very long (average of ~3,000 bases,  and can be several hundred thousands bases long), for example genes RBFOX1, CNTNAP2, PTPRD and DLG2. Dr. Senapathy has provided a plausible answer to these questions, which has remained the only explanation so far. Based on the split gene theory, exons of eukaryotic genes, if they originated from random DNA sequences, have to match the lengths of ORFs from random sequence, and possibly should be around 100 bases (close to the median length of ORFs in random sequence). The genome sequences of living organisms, for example the human, exhibits exactly the same average lengths of 120 bases for exons, and the longest exons of 600 bases (with few exceptions), which is the same length as that of the longest random ORFs. In addition, the introns can be very long, based on the split gene theory, which is found to be true in eukaryotic organisms.

Why genomes are large 
This work also explains why the genomes are very large, for example, the human genome with three billion bases, and why only a very small fraction of the human genome (~2%) codes for the proteins and other regulatory elements.  If split genes originated from random primordial DNA sequences, it would contain a significant amount of DNA that would be represented by introns. Furthermore, a genome assembled from random DNA containing split genes would also include intergenic random DNA. Thus, the nascent genomes that originated from random DNA sequences had to be large, regardless of the complexity of the organism. The observation that the genomes of several organisms such as that of the onion (~16 billion bases ) and salamander (~32 billion bases ) are much larger than that of the human (~3 billion bases ) but the organisms are no more complex than human provides credence to this split gene theory. Furthermore, the findings that the genomes of several organisms are smaller, although they contain essentially the same number of genes as that of the human, such as those of the C. elegans (genome size ~100 million bases, ~19,000 genes) and Arabidopsis (genome size ~125 million bases, ~25,000 genes), adds support to this theory. The split gene theory predicts that the introns in the split genes in these genomes could be the "reduced" (or deleted) form compared to the larger genes with long introns, thus leading to reduced genomes. In fact, researchers have recently proposed that these smaller genomes are actually reduced genomes, which adds support to the split gene theory.

Origin of the spliceosomal machinery and the eukaryotic cell nucleus 
Dr. Senapathy's research also addresses the origin of the spliceosomal machinery that edits out the introns from the RNA transcripts of genes. If the split genes had originated from random DNA, then the introns would have become an unnecessary but integral part of the eukaryotic genes along with the splice junctions at their ends. The spliceosomal machinery would be required to remove them and to enable the short exons to be linearly spliced together as a contiguously coding mRNA that can be translated into a complete protein. Thus, the split gene theory shows that the whole spliceosomal machinery originated due to the origin of split genes from random DNA sequences, and to remove the unnecessary introns.

Dr. Senapathy had also proposed a plausible mechanistic and functional rationale why the eukaryotic nucleus originated, a major unanswered question in biology.  If the transcripts of the split genes and the spliced mRNAs were present in a cell without a nucleus, the ribosomes would try to bind to both the un-spliced primary RNA transcript and the spliced mRNA, which would result in a molecular chaos. If a boundary had originated to separate the RNA splicing process from the mRNA translation, it can avoid this problem of molecular chaos. This is exactly what is found in eukaryotic cells, where the splicing of the primary RNA transcript occurs within the nucleus, and the spliced mRNA is transported to the cytoplasm, where the ribosomes translate them into proteins. The nuclear boundary provides a clear separation of the primary RNA splicing and the mRNA translation.

Origin of the eukaryotic cell 
These investigations thus led to the possibility that primordial DNA with essentially random sequence gave rise to the complex structure of the split genes with exons, introns and splice junctions. They also predict that the cells that harbored these split genes had to be complex with a nuclear cytoplasmic boundary, and must have had a spliceosomal machinery. Thus, it was possible that the earliest cell was complex and eukaryotic. Surprisingly, findings from extensive comparative genomics research from several organisms over the past 15 years are showing overwhelmingly that the earliest organisms could have been highly complex and eukaryotic, and could have contained complex proteins, exactly as predicted by Senapathy's theory.

The spliceosome is a highly complex machinery within the eukaryotic cell, containing ~200 proteins and several SnRNPs. In their paper  "Complex spliceosomal organization ancestral to extant eukaryotes," molecular biologists Dr. Lesley Collins and Dr. David Penny state "We begin with the hypothesis that ... the spliceosome has increased in complexity throughout eukaryotic evolution. However, examination of the distribution of spliceosomal components indicates that not only was a spliceosome present in the eukaryotic ancestor but it also contained most of the key components found in today's eukaryotes. ... the last common ancestor of extant eukaryotes appears to show much of the molecular complexity seen today." This suggests that the earliest eukaryotic organisms were highly complex and contained sophisticated genes and proteins, as the split gene theory predicts.

The Shapiro-Senapathy algorithm 
The split gene theory culminated in the Shapiro-Senapathy algorithm, which aids in the identification of splicing mutations that cause numerous diseases and adverse drug reactions. This algorithm is increasingly used in clinical practice and research not only to find mutations in known disease-causing genes in patients, but also to discover novel genes that are causal of different diseases. In addition, it is employed in finding the mechanism of aberrant splicing in individual patients as well as cohorts of patients with a particular disease. Furthermore, it is used in defining the cryptic splice sites and deducing the mechanisms by which mutations in them can affect normal splicing and lead to different diseases. It is also employed in addressing various questions in basic research in humans, animals and plants.

These contributions have impacted major questions in eukaryotic biology and their applications to human medicine. These applications may expand as the fields of clinical genomics and pharmacogenomics magnify their research with mega sequencing projects such as the All of Us project that will sequence a million individuals, and with the sequencing of millions of patients in clinical practice and research in the future.

Selected publications 

Senapathy, P. (1994) Independent Birth of Organisms. A New Theory That Distinct Organisms Arose Independently From The Primordial Pond Showing That Evolutionary Theories Are Fundamentally Incorrect

References

Living people
Evolutionary biologists
Indian Institute of Science alumni
Year of birth missing (living people)